Barwala may refer to:

 Barwala, Delhi, India
 Barwala, Hisar, Haryana, India
 Barwala (Ludhiana East), Punjab, India
 Barwala, Rajasthan, a village in Makrana tehsil
Barwala tehsil a pre-1891 tehsil covering Tohana#British Era 
 Barwala, Panchkula, Haryana, India
 Barwala Taluka, Gujarat, India
 Barvala, Botad district, headquarter of Barwala Taluka